This table displays the top-rated primetime television series of the 2002–03 season as measured by Nielsen Media Research.

References

2002 in American television
2003 in American television
2002-related lists
2003-related lists
Lists of American television series